Khadijeh Khatun (also Romanized as Khadījeh Khātūn) is a village in Neyzar Rural District, Salafchegan District, Qom County, Qom Province, Iran.

Description 
At the 2006 census, its population was 422, in 112 families.

References 

Populated places in Qom Province